Gerd Alfred Müller (1932 in Frankfurt am Main — December 6, 1991) was a German industrial designer. Müller's notable works include products for Braun and Lamy, Including Lamy's flagship product, the Lamy 2000.

Career 
In 1952, Müller began attending the Werkkunstschule Wiesbaden.

In 1955, he started working at Braun, where he worked for 5 years before departing in 1960. In his time with Braun, Müller developed various appliances including razors, record players, and kitchen appliances. Some of his notable designs for Braun include the KM 3 kitchen machine, the SM 3 razor, and the PC 3 record player (with Dieter Rams and Wilhelm Wagenfeld).

After his departure from Braun in 1960, Müller began working as a freelance industrial and graphic designer. In this time, he would design many writing instruments for Lamy. This includes their now flagship pen, the Lamy 2000, which he designed in 1966. He also developed the CP1, Twin, ST, and Unic models for Lamy.

Awards 
Industrie Forum Design Award for:
 1977 – Lamy Cp1
 1978 – Lamy 2000
 1982 – Lamy Marker Texto
 1985 – Lamy Unic
 1989 – Lamy Twin

References 

1932 births
1996 deaths
German designers
People from Frankfurt